Khosrowabad (also Romanized as Khosrowābād; also known as Khusroābād) is a village in Golshan Rural District, in the Central District of Tabas County, South Khorasan Province, Iran. At the 2006 census, its population was 912, in 219 families.

References 

Populated places in Tabas County